Márcio Batalha Jardim (born 25 March 1974) is a Brazilian teacher and politician. He was vice-president of National Union of Students (1997–2000). Jardim served as secretary of Sports and Leisure in Maranhão (2015–2017).

Political career 
Jardim appeared in politics when he was elected vice-president of National Union of Students (UNE) in 1997.

In 2002, Jardim ran for federal deputy, without success. Endorsed Jackson Lago and Lula.

In 2006, Jardim endorsed Jackson Lago and Lula.

In 2010, Jardim endorsed Flávio Dino and Dilma Rousseff.

In 2014, Jardim endorsed Flávio Dino and Dilma Rousseff.

References 

Living people
1974 births
Workers' Party (Brazil) politicians
Democratic Labour Party (Brazil) politicians